Kutuzov is a 1943 Soviet drama film directed by Vladimir Petrov.

Plot 
The film of 1943 shows the Russian view of the main events of the Patriotic War of 1812.

The main points are Kutuzov's character and warfare, the major battles, the soldiers and the major errors of Napoleon.
 "delaying operation" started by Mikhail Bogdanovich Barclay de Tolly and continued by Kutuzov
 "scorched earth" by burning Moscow
 "guerrilla warfare" on horseback against French supply lines by the Cossacks
 "total war" against French foraging by peasants 
 "no peacemaking with Napoleon" by Alexander I of Russia
 Battle of Borodino
 Battle of Maloyaroslavets
 Battle of the Berezina 
 French invasion of Russia#Logistics

Starring 
 Aleksei Dikij as Prince Kutuzov
 Semyon Mezhinsky as Napoleon Bonaparte
 Yevgeniy Kaluzhsky as Marshal Berthier
 Sergo Zakariadze as General Bagration 
 Nikolai Okhlopkov as General Barclay de Tolly
 Sergei Blinnikov as Ataman Platov
 Mikhail Pugovkin as Fedya

References

External links 
 Russian movie about Kutuzov in Russian language with English subtitles Kutuzov (film) 
 

1943 films
1940s Russian-language films
Films set in 1812
Films about the French invasion of Russia
Soviet drama films
Soviet black-and-white films
1943 drama films